Rajaram Nityananda (born 1948) is an Indian physicist who works on Solid State Physics, Liquid Crystals, Astronomical Optics, Image Processing, & Gravitational Dynamics. He currently works as professor at Azim Premji University Bengaluru. He was formerly the Director of the National Centre for Radio Astrophysics and also Tata Institute of Fundamental Research (TIFR) Centre for Interdisciplinary Sciences in Hyderabad. He served on the Physical Sciences jury for the Infosys Prize from 2015 to 2017. He also serves as an Associate Editor of the Journal of Astrophysics & Astronomy, published by the Indian Academy of Sciences. He also serves as the chief editor for Resonance Journal for Science Education published by Indian Academy of Sciences. He is also the Chairman of the Board of Directors of the National Institute of Technology, Tiruchirappalli and Chennai Mathematical Institute. He is currently serving as a faculty member at the Indian Institute of Science Education and Research, Pune. Previously he worked at Raman Research Institute from 1975 to 2000.

References

External links
Rajaram Nityananda's articles on INSPIRE-HEP

1948 births
Indian astrophysicists
Living people
Bangalore University alumni